Brantley Keith Gilbert  (born January 20, 1985) is an American country rock singer, songwriter and record producer from Jefferson, Georgia. He was originally signed to Colt Ford's label, Average Joes Entertainment, where he released Modern Day Prodigal Son and Halfway to Heaven. He is now signed to the Valory division of Big Machine Records where he has released five studio albums—a deluxe edition of Halfway to Heaven, Just as I Am, The Devil Don't Sleep, Fire & Brimstone, So Help Me God, and 14 country chart entries, four of which have gone to number one. He also co-wrote (with Colt Ford) and originally recorded Jason Aldean's singles "My Kinda Party" and "Dirt Road Anthem."

Career

2007-2013: A Modern Day Prodigal Son and Halfway to Heaven
Brantley Gilbert went to Nashville as a songwriter, where he signed to Warner Chappell Publishing. He continued performing at local venues. In 2009, he released his debut album, A Modern Day Prodigal Son, under independent label Average Joes Entertainment. He followed with Halfway to Heaven in 2010.

In 2011, he signed with Valory Music Co., a division of Big Machine Records, who released a deluxe edition of Halfway to Heaven. The album was produced by Dann Huff. Its first two singles, "Country Must Be Country Wide" and "You Don't Know Her Like I Do", both went to number one on the Hot Country Songs chart. After them, "Kick It in the Sticks" peaked at number 34, and "More Than Miles" at number 7 on Country Airplay. He won the ACM New Male Artist award in 2013.

2014-2017: Just as I Am and The Devil Don't Sleep
Gilbert's second Valory album (third overall), Just as I Am, was released in May 2014. Its lead single, "Bottoms Up," also reached number one. The second single, "Small Town Throwdown," featured guest vocals from labelmates Thomas Rhett and Justin Moore. The third single, "One Hell of an Amen," became Brantley's fourth number one hit in 2015. The album's fourth single was "Stone Cold Sober," released with the album's platinum edition.

Ahead of his fourth album, The Devil Don't Sleep, Gilbert released the single "The Weekend" as the album's leadoff single. Also included on the album is "The Ones That Like Me."

A deluxe edition of The Devil Don't Sleep includes ten bonus tracks: five demos, and five tracks cut from a live performance at the Red Rocks Amphitheatre.

2018-present: Fire & Brimstone and So Help Me God 
In December 2018, Gilbert released a duet with Lindsay Ell, "What Happens in a Small Town", as the leadoff single to his upcoming fifth studio album, Fire & Brimstone. The album was released in October 2019. "Fire’t Up" was released as the second single off the album.

In June 2020, Gilbert released the single "Hard Days." The song was later included on a deluxe edition of Fire & Brimstone.

In June 2021, Gilbert released the single "The Worst Country Song of All Time", featuring Hardy and Toby Keith, and followed it up with the promotional single "Gone But Not Forgotten" in September 2021. In March 2022, Gilbert and Jason Aldean released another promotional single "Rolex® on a Redneck".

Gilbert released his sixth studio album So Help Me God on November 10, 2022 and announced "Heaven by Then", featuring Blake Shelton and Vince Gill, as the album's second official single. He opened for Five Finger Death Punch on their late 2022 headlining tour along with Cory Marks in the United States. Gilbert is set to join Nickelback's "Get Rollin' Tour" in summer 2023 in North America as an opening act alongside fellow country artist Josh Ross.

Songwriting
In addition to his original work, Gilbert has written songs that Colt Ford and Jason Aldean have recorded. The songs "Dirt Road Anthem" (co-written and originally recorded by him and Colt Ford) and "My Kinda Party" were released on Aldean's 2010 album My Kinda Party. "My Kinda Party" was originally recorded by Gilbert on Modern Day Prodigal Son, while "Dirt Road Anthem" was on Halfway to Heaven. Aldean has also covered Gilbert's "The Best of Me", available on the iTunes release of his 2009 album Wide Open. Gilbert has also co-written the tracks "The Same Way" on Aldean's album 9 and "Small Town Small" on his album Macon, Georgia.

Personal life
It was announced in September 2012 that Brantley Gilbert was dating country music singer and actress Jana Kramer. They met at the CMT Music Awards in June 2012. They were engaged on January 20, 2013, his 28th birthday. They split in August 2013.

In June 2015, Gilbert married Georgia school teacher Amber Cochran in a small ceremony at his home. He admitted that she was the girl who inspired his singles "You Don't Know Her Like I Do" and "More Than Miles", among several others. In 2017, on his "The Devil Don't Sleep" tour, he announced he would be a father in November. In 2017, Gilbert and his wife welcomed their first child, a son. In 2019, they welcomed their second child, a daughter.

In 2013, Gilbert embarked on an eight-day USO tour to entertain American service members stationed in Italy and Kuwait.

Brantley Gilbert was in a near-fatal truck accident when he was 19. Gilbert is an active Christian, and his song "My Faith In You", from his album Just as I Am, speaks of his faith. In May 2015, Gilbert got a tattoo showing his support of the Second Amendment to the United States Constitution.

Gilbert chose to headline the NRA's Country Concert in February, 2023 two days before the 5 year anniversary of the Parkland massacre.

Tours

2011
Willie Nelson's Country Throwdown Tour
Taste of Country Christmas Tour (headline) with Thomas Rhett
2012
Eric Church's Blood, Sweat and Beers Tour
Toby Keith's Live in Overdrive Tour
Hell on Wheels Tour (headline) Brian Davis, Greg Bates, and Uncle Kracker
2013
Tim McGraw's Two Lanes of Freedom Tour
2014
Let It Ride (first leg with Thomas Rhett, Eric Paslay, and Brian Davis); (second leg with Brian Davis, Chase Bryant, Aaron Lewis, and Tyler Farr; Lewis and Farr split dates)
2015
Kenny Chesney's The Big Revival Tour
2016
The Blackout Tour January – April (headline) with Brian Davis, Michael Ray, and Canaan Smith
Take It Outside Tour June – October (headline) with Colt Ford, and Justin Moore
2017
The Devil Don't Sleep Tour February – April (headline) with Tucker Beathard and Luke Combs
2018
The Ones That Like Me Tour (headline)
Kid Rock's Red Blooded Rock N Roll Redneck Extravaganza Tour (co-headline)
2019
 Not Like Us Tour (headline)
2023
Nickelback's Get Rollin' Tour

Discography

Albums
A Modern Day Prodigal Son (2009)
Halfway to Heaven (2010)
Just as I Am (2014)
The Devil Don't Sleep (2017)
Fire & Brimstone (2019)
 So Help Me God (2022)

Awards and nominations

References

External links
 

1985 births
Living people
American country singer-songwriters
American male singer-songwriters
Average Joes Entertainment artists
Big Machine Records artists
Christians from Georgia (U.S. state)
Country musicians from Georgia (U.S. state)
American country rock singers
People from Jefferson, Georgia
21st-century American singers
21st-century American male singers
Singer-songwriters from Georgia (U.S. state)